Pööravere is a village in Põhja-Pärnumaa Parish, Pärnu County in southwestern Estonia.

Zoologist and explorer Alexander von Middendorff (1815–1894) lived in Pööravere Manor.

References

 

Villages in Pärnu County
Kreis Pernau